The Jiahu gǔdí are the oldest known musical instruments from China, dating back to around 6000 BCE. Gudi  means "bone flute" in Chinese.

History 
Since 1984, six complete bone flutes, as well as the fragments of at least thirty more, have been excavated from several early Neolithic Jiahu culture tombs in Jiahu, Wuyan County, Henan Province, in Central China. They have been dated to 6000 BCE.

Description 
They are open-ended and vary in the number of their finger holes, from one to eight; the 24 holed version has 23 holes in front and one thumb hole in back. The number of holes and the spacing between the holes determined the musical range and scale or mode in which the flute was intended to function. Lee and Shen believed that the Jiahu culture understood the "resonance of an air column" (see open tube and closed tube) and were able to create an instrument that contained their "complete interval preference of Chinese music". Blowing across the open end of an end-blown bone flute to produce a musical sound, is accomplished in the same way, and produces a similar effect, as blowing across the open top of a bottle. The eight-holed flute can play "all harmonic intervals and two registers." These harmonic intervals are said to be a "function of culture" and were of a larger set compared to that now familiar in the West. Bone flutes were apparently also played as part of sacrificial rites, and employed in bird hunting. Gudi are not very common now, but there are some musicians today who play them.

Gallery

See also 
Chinese flutes
Divje Babe Flute
Dizi
End-blown flute
Music of China
Paleolithic flutes
Traditional Chinese musical instruments

References

Sources 

 Chang, Lulu Huang. From Confucius to Kublai Khan. Canada: The Institute of Mediaeval Music, 1993. (2-7)
 Lee, Yuan-Yuan and Sin-Yan Shen. Chinese Musical Instruments. Chicago: Chinese Music Society of North America, 1999. (63-66)
 Shen, Sin-Yan. China: A Journey into Its Musical Art. Chicago: Chinese Music Society of North America, 2000. (107-108)
 So, Jenny F. ed. Music in the Age of Confucius. Washington, D.C.: Freer Gallery of Art and Arthur M Sackler Gallery, 2000. (88-90)
 Wu, Ben. “Archaeology and History of Musical Instruments in China”. The Garland Encyclopedia of World Music East Asia: China, Japan, and Korea. Vol. 7. Ed Robert C. Provine, Yosihiko Tokumaru, and J Laurence Witzleban. New York: Routledge, 2002. (105-6)

Further reading

External links 
Flutes under Wind Section

Natural History Magazine

Sample music 
Turkey Bone Flute
Samples in Article

End-blown flutes
6th-millennium BC works